Chaumukhi Mahadev, or Chaturmukhi Mahadev, is a historic Hindu temple located approximately  east of Vaishali Gadh, Bihar, India. The temple has Shivling with four god faces, Brahma, Vishnu, Mahesh and Surya. While the construction time is unknown, it is believed to have been built during the fifth century.

References
1. South Asian Handbook, 1994
2.Archaeology of Vaishali by Dilip Kumar.

5th-century Hindu temples
Hindu temples in Bihar
Shiva_temples_in_Bihar